Erik Frey (1 March 1908 – 2 September 1988) was an Austrian film actor. He appeared in more than 110 films between 1936 and 1988. He was born and died in Vienna, Austria. He was married to the actress Jane Tilden.

Selected filmography

 Court Theatre (1936)
 Love is Duty Free (1941)
 Late Love (1943)
 The Heart Must Be Silent (1944)
 Viennese Girls (1945)
 The Immortal Face (1947)
 The Other Life (1948)
 Eroica (1949)
 Dear Friend (1949)
 Vagabonds (1949)
 Cordula (1950)
 The Fourth Commandment (1950)
 Vienna Waltzes (1951)
 City Park (1951)
 Maria Theresa (1951)
 1. April 2000 (1952)
 The Immortal Vagabond (1953)
 The Emperor Waltz (1953)
 The Eternal Waltz (1954)
 The Forester of the Silver Wood (1954)
 Sarajevo (1955)
 The Doctor's Secret (1955)
 Crown Prince Rudolph's Last Love (1955)
 Ludwig II (1955)
 The Last Ten Days (1955)
 Espionage (1955)
 His Daughter is Called Peter (1955)
 Through the Forests and Through the Trees (1956)
 Forest Liesel (1956)
 Night Nurse Ingeborg (1958)
 Jacqueline (1959)
 The Reverend Turns a Blind Eye (1971)
 The Standard (1977)
 Goetz von Berlichingen of the Iron Hand (1979)

References

External links

1908 births
1988 deaths
Austrian male film actors
Austrian male television actors
Male actors from Vienna
20th-century Austrian male actors
Burials at Döbling Cemetery